Dante Benedetti  (May 16, 1919 – November 16, 2005) was an American restaurateur and collegiate baseball coach.  He was born in San Francisco and remained there the rest of his life.  His family owned New Pisa, a restaurant in San Francisco's North Beach neighborhood.  He loved baseball and coached at the University of San Francisco for 29 years. USF's current baseball field is named after him.  Benedetti, with 373 wins, was San Francisco's all-time winningest coach until Nino Giarratano surpassed him in 2012.

References

External links
 Profile of Dante Benedetti
 Dante Benedetti's obituary

1919 births
2005 deaths
20th-century American businesspeople
Alameda Coast Guard Sea Lions football players
San Francisco Dons baseball coaches
San Francisco Dons football players
Businesspeople from San Francisco
Food and drink in the San Francisco Bay Area
Players of American football from San Francisco
Baseball coaches from California